This article lists census-designated places (CDPs) in the U.S. state of Tennessee. As of 2018, there were a total of 81 census-designated places in Tennessee.

Census-Designated Places

References

See also
List of municipalities in Tennessee
List of counties in Tennessee

Census-designated places in Tennessee
Census-designated places
Tennessee